Taïryk Arconte (born 12 November 2003) is a French professional footballer who plays as a winger for  club Brest.

Club career
Arconte made his debut with Ajaccio in a 1–1 Ligue 2 win over Valenciennes on 3 April 2021.

On the final day of the 2022 summer transfer window, Arconte moved to Ligue 1 club Brest on a four-year contract.

References

External links
 
 

2003 births
Living people
People from Les Abymes
Guadeloupean footballers
French footballers
France youth international footballers
French people of Guadeloupean descent
Association football wingers
CS Moulien players
AC Ajaccio players
Stade Brestois 29 players
Ligue 1 players
Ligue 2 players
Championnat National 3 players